Flex is an EP released in 2003 by New Zealand electronica duo, Pitch Black.

Track listing
Flex
Ape To Angel
Flex (Automatic Re-Dub)
Flex (son.sine Re-Dub)
Protect The Grain

Pitch Black (band) albums
2003 EPs